Pat Coyle (born September 17, 1969 in Orangeville, Ontario) is a retired lacrosse player. In his National Lacrosse League career, Coyle played for the Detroit Turbos, the Ontario Raiders, the Toronto Rock, and the Colorado Mammoth. Coyle was named Defensive Player of the Year in 2002, and won five NLL Championships; four with the Toronto Rock and one with the Colorado Mammoth. He has been the head coach of the Colorado Mammoth since 2017.

Professional career
In 1994, Coyle played with the Detroit Turbos of the MILL, but was suspended indefinitely from the MILL for striking a referee. When the MILL became the NLL in 1998, it was decided that the suspension did not apply to the new league, and Coyle was signed by the Ontario Raiders. The Raiders became the Toronto Rock the next season, and Coyle went on to win four championships with the Rock before being traded to the Vancouver Ravens after the 2004 season. However, just weeks before the 2005 season began, the league announced that the Ravens would not play in 2005, and Coyle immediately became a free agent. He was signed by the Colorado Mammoth, where he won his fifth championship in 2006.

During the 2008 season, Coyle announced that he would be retiring after the season. He was named to the Canadian Lacrosse Hall of Fame in 2017.

Statistics

NLL
Reference:

Awards

References

1969 births
Canadian expatriate lacrosse people in the United States
Canadian lacrosse players
Canadian people of Irish descent
Colorado Mammoth players
Lacrosse defenders
Lacrosse people from Ontario
Living people
National Lacrosse League All-Stars
National Lacrosse League major award winners
People from Orangeville, Ontario
Toronto Rock players